Radio Télévision Gabonaise (RTG) is the national broadcaster of the Central African state of Gabon. Radio Télévision Gabonaise is headquartered in Gabon's capital city, Libreville.

It was established in 28 November 1959 with the start of Radio-Gabon. Television broadcasts started in 9 May 1963 through channel 3 on Libreville while in November 1965 a new station opened on Port-Gentil (channel 10). An additional television station operates in Franceville.

A large radio station is operated in Oyem. Radio Télévision Gabonaise achieved nationwide radio coverage in the late 1980s through a network of smaller provincial stations. 

The name was changed in 2012 to Gabon Télévision.

See also
 Media of Gabon

References

Lyngsat address

Publicly funded broadcasters
Television stations in Gabon
Radio stations established in 1959
Television channels and stations established in 1966
State media